Nancy Seedy Njie (born November 7, 1965) is a Gambian politician who served as the Secretary of State for Tourism and Culture from 2008 until 2010.

References

1965 births
Living people
Government ministers of the Gambia
Serer politicians
21st-century Gambian women politicians
21st-century Gambian politicians
Women government ministers of the Gambia